The Catholic Church in Guinea-Bissau is part of the worldwide Catholic Church, under the spiritual leadership of the Pope in Rome.

There are about 126,026 Catholics in Guinea-Bissau, or about 8.9% of the total population.

There are two dioceses:
Bafatá
Bissau

References

External links
 http://www.catholic-hierarchy.org/country/gw.html

 
Guinea-Bissau
Guinea-Bissau